(born 1970) is a Paralympian wheelchair racing athlete from Japan competing mainly in category T54 long-distance events.

Masazumi was the men's wheelchair winner of the 2011 New York Marathon and the 2011 Boston Marathon. He has competed in the marathon in both the 2004 and 2008 Summer Paralympics, 10000m in 2004, 5000m and 1500m in 2008 but it was as part of the Japanese 4 × 400 m relay in 2004 that he won his only medal, a bronze.

He later moved into administration of wheelchair racing, serving as the race director of the wheelchair section of the 2019 Tokyo Marathon.

References

Living people
1970 births
Japanese male wheelchair racers
Paralympic wheelchair racers
Athletics (track and field) administrators
Japanese sports executives and administrators
Paralympic athletes of Japan
Paralympic bronze medalists for Japan
Athletes (track and field) at the 2004 Summer Paralympics
Medalists at the 2004 Summer Paralympics
Paralympic medalists in athletics (track and field)
21st-century Japanese people